Jessica Hart may refer to:
 Jessica Hart (writer)
 Jessica Hart (model)